The M55 is a motorway in Lancashire, England, which can also be referred to as the Preston Northern Bypass. It connects the seaside resort of  Blackpool to the M6 at Preston.  It is 12.2 miles (19.6 km) in length.

One mile was originally built in 1958 as part of the UK's first motorway, the Preston Bypass, and the remainder was built in 1975.

Route
The M55 has three lanes in both directions for most of its length. After leaving the M6 at junction 32, the road immediately interchanges with the A6. It then crosses the West Coast Main Line and Lancaster Canal before passing north of Wesham to meet the A585 at junction 3. It then continues west in a rural setting to meet A583 at junction 4, where the motorway ends and becomes the A5230.  The western part of the M55, and the first few hundred metres of the A5230, occupy the route of the old Blackpool Branch railway line.

History

M6 to junction 1 opened as part of the M6 Preston By-pass in 1958.
Junctions 1 to 4 opened in 1975.

The first motorway constructed in Great Britain was the M6 Preston Bypass, opened in 1958.  This ran from the current M6 junction 29 to the M55 junction 1.  It was built as a two-lane route.  In 1965 the M6 was extended north from what is the current day junction 32 to meet the Lancaster Bypass, and the M6 junction was rebuilt to its current design to connect the A6 at the now M55 junction 1.  Due to increasing traffic, it was decided to provide a motorway link to Blackpool and this road was opened in 1975.

Some of the material for backfilling the new M55 was obtained from a nearby disused airfield at RNAS Inskip, where the runways were broken up and the land returned to agriculture. More material came from the Tootle Heights quarries in Longridge.

Future  plans
The motorway has no junction 2.  A proposed South Ribble link road would have involved the extension of the M65 motorway around the west of Preston to link to the M55 at the missing junction. The link road proposal has been dormant since the mid-1990s. Between 1993 and 1995, the M6 around the east of Preston was widened to four lanes, making the link road proposal less likely.

As part of a City Deal signed between Preston City Council and central Government in late 2013, both Lancashire County Council and Preston City Council agreed in principle to build a 'Preston Western Distributor Road' which would link the A583/A584 outside Clifton to a new junction 2 of the M55.

Construction of the new road began in September 2019 and will involve a new motorway junction, four new bridges and two viaducts. Completion of the £200million scheme is scheduled for early in 2023.

Incidents

Aircraft test landing
During construction of the M55, a Jaguar military aircraft from nearby Warton Aerodrome made a test landing on the motorway, in order to prove its capability to use makeshift runways in time of war.

Junctions

The entire route is in the ceremonial county of Lancashire.

{| class="plainrowheaders wikitable"
|-
!scope=col|Location
!scope=col|mi
!scope=col|km
!scope=col|Junction
!scope=col|Destinations
!scope=col|Notes
|-
| rowspan="2" |Preston
|0
|0
|M6 J32
| – Manchester, Liverpool, Lancaster
|
|-
|1.0
|1.6
|1
| – Preston, Garstang
|
|-
| rowspan="2" |—
|3.4
|5.5
| bgcolor="ffdead" |2
| bgcolor="ffdead" |Cottam, Ashton-on-Ribble
| bgcolor="ffdead" |Under construction
|-
|8.1
|13.1
|3
| – Kirkham, Preston, Fleetwood
|
|-
|Blackpool
|12.2
|19.6
|4
| – Kirkham, Blackpool
 – Lytham St Annes
|
|-

Coordinate list

Junctions 3, 4, and 32 are visual reporting points (VRPs) for general aviation aircraft in the local Blackpool airspace.

See also
List of motorways in the United Kingdom

References

External links

 CBRD Motorway Database - M55
Lancashire County Council - Historic Highways - M55
 The Motorway Archive - M55

5-0055
5-0055
The Fylde